Dulaara (Hindi: दुलारा) is a 2015 Indian Bhojpuri language film produced and directed by Rajkumar R. Pandey. It stars, Pradeep Pandey "Chintu", Tanushree, Mohini Ghosh]], Manoj Tiger, Gopal Rai, Awadhesh Mishra, Rani Chatterjee. In this movie Pradeep Pandey aka chintu is in lead role and Tanushree Chatterjee, Ritu Singh and Mohini Ghosh are in his opposite.

Plot

Cast

Pradeep Pandey As Raja
Tanushree Chatterjee
Ritu Singh
Mohini Ghosh
Manoj Tiger
Gopal Rai
Awadhesh Mishra
Sanjay Pandey
Rani Chatterjee

Soundtrack

The music of Dulaara is composed by Rajkumar R. Pandey and the lyrics are written by Pyare Lal Yadav, Shyam Dehati and Rajkumar R. Pandey. The music is launched on 4 August 2015.

Track listing

References

External links

 

2015 films
2010s Hindi-language films
Cross-dressing in Indian films
Films directed by Rajkumar R. Pandey
2010s Bhojpuri-language films
2015 multilingual films
Indian multilingual films